The Galle Municipal Council is the local council for Galle, the capital city of Southern Province of Sri Lanka, the third level administrative division of the country. The council was established under the Municipalities Ordinance of 1865 as the third municipal council of Sri Lanka. Wijeyananda Dahanayake was the first elected mayor of the city, who was appointed in 1939. He later went on to become the fifth Prime Minister of Ceylon. The current mayor of Galle is Priyantha Godagama Sahabandu.

Geography

Administrative units
Galle Municipal Council is divided into 50 Grama Niladhari Divisions (GN Divisions), with seven villages.

Population
The current population of Galle Four Gravets area, according to 2011 Census, is 101,159, a decline from the population of 103,246 in 2001.

Mayor

The Mayor of Galle is the head of Galle Municipal Council and his office is located at the Galle Town Hall. The current mayor is Priyantha Godagama Sahabandu , who was elected into office, subsequent to the 2018 Sri Lankan local elections, in a secret ballot held on 23 March 2018. Sahabandu was elected to the position of mayor obtaining 20 votes to 11 over his rival candidate, Jilith Nishantha of the UNP.

Representation
The Galle Municipal Council is divided into 15 wards and is represented by 35 councillors, elected using an open list proportional representation system.

2018 local government election
Results of the local government election held on 8 February 2018:

2011 local government election
Results of the local government election held on 8 October 2011:

The Galle Municipal Council has five standing committees each headed by committee chairman. The standing committees are Finance and Tender, Works and Solid Waste, Health and Sanitisation, Electricity and Water, and Environment.

References

External links 
 City of Galle website

Galle
Local authorities in Southern Province, Sri Lanka
Municipal councils of Sri Lanka